Tufino is a town and comune (municipality) of c. 3,400 inhabitants in the Metropolitan City of Naples  in the Italian region Campania, located about 30 km northeast of Naples.

Tufino borders the following municipalities: Avella, Casamarciano, Cicciano, Comiziano, Roccarainola.

Demographic evolution

References

Cities and towns in Campania